Ranjit Gazmer is an Indian film music director and a musician, who is noted for his work in Nepali-language films. He had a long association with music director R.D. Burman as a musician.

Early life
Ranjit Gazmer is from a gold merchant family of Darjeeling, West Bengal.

Gazmer was a student of Amber Gurung at his Art Academy of Music in Darjeeling. His contemporaries were Gopal Yonzon, Karma Yonzon, Sharan Pradhan, Aruna Lama and Jitendra Bardewa, all of whom went on to be musicians. He was a part of a musical group called 'Sangam Club' and was also a drummer for 'The Hillians', the first-ever western band formed in Darjeeling. In 1966, he moved to Birgunj, Nepal with his friends, which included Anuradha Koirala (then Anuradha Gurung), managing an English-medium private school. In 1967, Gazmer moved to Kathmandu with his friends and became a studio musician at Radio Nepal. Later, he moved to Mumbai (then Bombay) to pursue his music career there with R.D. Burman.

Career

Initial works
Gazmer joined George Banks, father of Louis Banks and was performing in his Band. When the Royal Nepal Academy was opened by King Mahendra, Ramsaran Darnal, who worked in the Academy called up Gazmer and gave him a job.

Manohari Singh, a close aid of the Burmans, invited Gazmer to join him in Mumbai. Gazmer arrived in Mumbai on 25 December 1971. Singh then introduced him to R.D. Burman. After initial introduction where he played a tune composed by himself, he was asked to be present in a recording at Film Centre, Tardeo. When Gazmer reached there, he was surprised and happy to see that the tune which he had played in front of Burman when being introduced was being recorded. The song was 'Kanchi Re Kanchi Re', which had been inspired from Gazmer's composition 'Kancha Re Kancha'. After the recording, Burman told him, "This is your song. And from today, you shall be called 'Kancha'". Since then, he was a sitting member of Burman's team as a percussionist until Burman's death in 1994.

Music
Gazmer worked under R.D. Burman in Mumbai, playing madal in several Hindi film songs. In 1982, Ranjit arranged for Asha Bhosle to sing her first Nepali film song with him. Asha Bhosle's first Nepali song was however in the film Maitighar. Ranjit he has composed music for several Nepali films such as Samjhana, Kusume Rumal, Lahure, Saino, and Darpan Chaya. He is based in Mumbai and records songs in the studios there.

Discography

As a music director

References

External links
 Nepali Songs of Ranjit Gazmer
  Guftagoo Program Rajyasabha TV

Living people
People from Darjeeling district
Nepalese musicians
1941 births
Musicians from West Bengal
Nepali-language singers from India